The Ngatapa Branch was a secondary branch line railway  long that for a short time formed part of the national rail network in Poverty Bay in the North Island of New Zealand.

Built to the New Zealand standard  gauge the branch was originally authorized as part of the proposed inland route for the Wairoa to Gisborne section of the Palmerston North – Gisborne Line. However, in 1924, an engineer's report recommended that the then-new isolated section between Wairoa and Waikokopu in Hawke's Bay be incorporated as the southernmost portion of a new coastal route from Wairoa to Gisborne.  The Public Works Department (PWD) accordingly stopped work on the inland Ngatapa route, which was officially opened as a branch line on 15 December 1924, and began work on the coastal route. The Ngatapa branch became a dead end, and it was closed on 1 April 1931.

Construction 
Construction started in 1911, and the line was completed to Ngatapa by December 1915, although it was not formally handed over to the New Zealand Railways Department (NZR) until 15 December 1924. Between 1918 and 1920, work started at Wairoa on the section to Frasertown, which was to have been linked through to Ngatapa, and on the Waikura section beyond Ngatapa, but all work was stopped in 1920 after the Waikura section was found to be unstable.

Construction of the line presented few problems as far as Ngatapa.  The course of the line beyond this point was a different matter and would have required heavy earthworks and extensive tunneling.  Beyond Ngatapa, some formation work was undertaken for about 8 km, including the excavation of a short tunnel, but rails were never laid on the section. Today, earthworks such as embankments and cuttings can still be found, but no actual tunnels can be located, possibly due to collapse in the slip prone ground.

Operations and closure
By December 1915 the Public Works Department (PWD) was operating goods trains on the branch, and continued to do so until responsibility for the line was transferred to the NZR.  The line carried only about 12,000 tonnes of freight per annum, almost all road metal.  By 1930 a Railways Commission noted that with the abandonment of the originally proposed inland route the need for the line had disappeared, and the twice-daily Monday to Saturday NZR service attracted an average of only 20 passengers a day.  The commission recommended the branch should either close or be taken over by its users, the PWD, or the Gisborne City Council.  There were no takers, and the line was closed on 1 April 1931.

Remains
Not much remains of the branch formation or other works on the coastal plain.  Apart from the bridge piers of the Waipaoa River crossing between Makaraka and Patutahi, the most significant remains are those past the original terminus at Ngatapa, over which trains never ran but which illustrate the problems that would have faced the constructors if the line had continued into the hills.  Beyond the terminus at Ngatapa the formation works take the proposed line through a 180-degree climbing turn before following a winding path across the face of the hills until disappearing into the bush.

See also
Palmerston North–Gisborne Line
Ahuriri / Napier Port Branch
Moutohora / Makaraka Branch

References

Bibliography

External links
NZ Rail Maps (Palmerston North Gisborne Line - Other Lines files)

Railway lines in New Zealand
Railway lines opened in 1915
Railway lines closed in 1931
Rail transport in the Gisborne District
1915 establishments in New Zealand
1931 disestablishments in New Zealand
3 ft 6 in gauge railways in New Zealand
Closed railway lines in New Zealand